Lankower See (Schwerin) is a lake in West Mecklenburg, Mecklenburg-Vorpommern, Germany. At an elevation of 42.5 m, its surface area is 0.54 km².

External links 
 

Lakes of Mecklenburg-Western Pomerania